Nicolás Ignacio Peñailillo Acuña (born 13 June 1991) is a Chilean football who plays for Chilean Primera División club Unión La Calera as a left-back.

Club career
On second half 2022, he returned to Chile after his step in Argentina and joined Deportes Antofagasta.

References

External links
 

1991 births
Living people
Sportspeople from Viña del Mar
Chilean footballers
Chile under-20 international footballers
Chilean expatriate footballers
Association football defenders
Everton de Viña del Mar footballers
FC Zenit Saint Petersburg players
Deportes Iquique footballers
C.D. Antofagasta footballers
Unión de Santa Fe footballers
Chilean Primera División players
Primera B de Chile players
Russian Premier League players
Argentine Primera División players
Chilean expatriate sportspeople in Russia
Chilean expatriate sportspeople in Argentina
Expatriate footballers in Russia
Expatriate footballers in Argentina